CBGB is a 2013 American biographical drama film about the former New York music venue CBGB.  It follows the story of Hilly Kristal's New York club from its concept as a venue for Country, Bluegrass and Blues (CBGB) to what it ultimately became: the birthplace of underground rock 'n' roll and punk. The film uses devices such as a comic book-style panels, as well as onscreen text to identify important figures in the punk movement.

Plot
In 1970s New York City, Hilly Kristal is divorced and has filed bankruptcy for the second time. Despite setbacks, he is determined to own and manage a bar. With his business partner Merv Ferguson, Kristal convinces his mother to lend them the money needed to establish the dive bar CBGB, which Kristal intends to make into a country music venue.

The business gets off to a rocky start as there are few customers and Kristal has difficulty finding country acts. However, a rock band called Television arrives at the bar and auditions. Seeing potential, Kristal books them. CBGB soon becomes a rock venue that caters to the burgeoning punk movement. New acts such as Blondie, Patti Smith, Talking Heads, and The Ramones begin to get noticed by playing at the club. The fledgling fanzine Punk also gets its start by reporting on the bands and debating the movement's ideology (or lack thereof). Despite CBGB's newfound success, Kristal poorly manages the club's funds (he keeps the money in his apartment freezer) and fails to regularly pay bills or rent. Kristal's daughter Lisa tries to take over the chaotic finances in an attempt to save the business.

After The Ramones are signed to Sire Records, Kristal decides to manage CBGB regulars The Dead Boys. Lisa warns Kristal that he can't financially afford to take on a band. Kristal ignores her, as well as others who caution him about The Dead Boys' destructive and anti-social behavior. While on tour, the band crashes and totals their truck and equipment, leaving Kristal and CBGB broke. This leads to Ferguson threatening to leave the business for good, which Kristal doesn't believe. Soon afterwards, The Dead Boys gets into a fight with a group of thugs and their drummer, Johnny Blitz, is stabbed seventeen times and barely survives.

Despondent and penniless, Kristal announces to his employees that CBGB will be closing. Ferguson and Lisa reveal that they have made many calls to grateful friends whom Kristal helped in the past. They've scraped together enough money to stay open long enough to stabilize the situation. The film ends with The Police auditioning for Kristal.

The epilogue reveals that CBGB remained open until 2006. Kristal remains an important figure in the history of punk and rock and roll. Lisa went on to become a lawyer. Ferguson always wore a yellow construction helmet and no one ever knew why. Kristal continued to manage The Dead Boys until they broke up in 1979. The epilogue closes by stating Kristal's dog, Jonathan, had legendary bowels since he was known for defecating wherever he pleased inside the club.  Over the final credits, the real-life Talking Heads' acceptance speech during the 2002 Rock and Roll Hall of Fame Induction Ceremony is played, during which they invite Kristal to the stage and thank him for his support.

Cast

Release
CBGB premiered on DirecTV's video on demand platform "DirecTV Cinema" on September 5, 2013 and was available through October 2, 2013, in standard and high-definition formats (including "Yekra", an all-new independent film streaming and social distribution site). Following a national release in select theaters beginning October 4, 2013, it was shown at various times throughout the CBGB Music & Film Festival in New York City from October 9 through October 13, 2013. The DVD and Blu-ray were scheduled for release on December 31, 2013.

Reception

Box office
CBGB made its theatrical premiere on October 4, 2013 and grossed $3,909 at the box office its opening weekend from one theater. The film then began its wide release in select theaters October 4, 2013. The total U.S. theatrical gross for the film was $40,400.

Critical response
The film has been panned by critics. Film review aggregator Rotten Tomatoes reports that 7% of critics gave the film a positive review based on 43 reviews, with a weighted average score of 3.4/10, with the consensus simply reading "Hey! Ho! No no!". At Metacritic, the film has received an average score of 30 out of 100, based on 17 reviews from mainstream critics, indicating "generally unfavorable reviews".

Robert Abele of the Los Angeles Times called it "merely a mess of caricatures". Likewise, Brian McManus of The Village Voice writes: "CBGB's biggest problem is that it's taken such electrifying source material and done absolutely zilch with it."

Soundtrack

The soundtrack was released on October 8, 2013. It is available on CD, Vinyl and as a digital download. The first pressing Omnivore released of the soundtrack is a double album on translucent pink vinyl. Rhino released a deluxe digital version with additional tracks on the same day.

References

External links

 
 
 
 
 

2013 films
2013 biographical drama films
2013 independent films
2010s musical drama films
American biographical drama films
American independent films
American musical drama films
American rock music films
Biographical films about musicians
Films about musical groups
Films directed by Randall Miller
Films set in New York City
Films shot in New York City
Punk films
2013 drama films
2010s English-language films
2010s American films